Malia (born 1978) is a singer from Malawi. She has released seven studio albums.

Biography
Malia's mother is Malawian and her father is from the United Kingdom. She moved to London when she was a teenager. After finishing school, Malia pursued a career in music. She worked as a waitress while she organized a band to accompany her, singing ballads and jazz standards in bars and clubs around London. During a visit to New York City, she heard a pop-jazz track sung in French by vocalist Liane Foly that had been produced by André Manoukian. She contacted Manoukian to solicit his help and they set to work on her 2002 debut album, Yellow Daffodils. Though the release featured English lyrics, she gained recognition in France and Germany. Her subsequent releases, Echoes of Dreams (2004) and Young Bones (2007), found favor among jazz fans across Europe.

Discography

References

External links

Official website
Malia on Myspace
Malia on JazzEcho

1978 births
Living people
Malawian emigrants to the United Kingdom
21st-century Malawian women singers